Robin Wright (born 1966) is an American film actress.

Robin Wright may also refer to:
 Robin Wright (author) (born 1948), American journalist, author and foreign affairs analyst
 Robin Wright (rugby union) (1885–1958), Irish rugby international